Sharikabad-e Olya (also Romanized as Sharīkābād-e ‘Olyā; also known as Sharīkābād) is a village in Nakhlestan Rural District, in the Central District of Kahnuj County, Kerman Province, Iran. At the 2006 census, its population was 15, in 5 families.

References 

Populated places in Kahnuj County